Paintersville is an unincorporated community in Greene County, in the U.S. state of Ohio.

History
Paintersville was platted in 1837, and named for Jesse Painter, the town merchant. A post office called Paintersville was established in 1847, and remained in operation until 1910.

Notable person
Karl King, bandmaster and composer

References

Unincorporated communities in Greene County, Ohio
1837 establishments in Ohio
Populated places established in 1837
Unincorporated communities in Ohio